Captain Arthur Ryan Smith Jr. OC AOE DFC (May 16, 1919 – June 30, 2008) was a Canadian oilfield worker, fighter pilot, executive business man, philanthropist, magazine editor, advertising executive and politician on the municipal, provincial and federal levels of government.

Early life
Arthur Ryan Smith was born in Calgary, Alberta, on May 16, 1919, to Arthur LeRoy Smith, Member of Parliament for Calgary West from 1945 to 1951, and Sara Isobel Ryan. He grew up in Calgary and in British Columbia. He got his first job as an oil field worker at the age of 16 in Turner Valley, Alberta, and spent four years working in the oil patch.

At the outbreak of World War II Smith enlisted in the Royal Canadian Air Force and became a pilot.  He flew 34 combat missions on Lancaster bombers and was awarded the Distinguished Flying Cross.  When Smith returned home from the war he went back to work in the oil patch. He worked his way up from roughneck to Assistant of the President at the Anglo-American Oil Company. In 1952 he became editor for the publication Petroleum Exploration Digest.

Smith and Ron Butlin co-hosted a weekly sports radio show during the 1950s on CFAC.

Municipal politics
Smith was elected to Calgary city council in 1953 and served there until 1955 when he decided to run for a seat in the provincial legislature.

Smith returned to city council after retiring from federal politics in 1963. He was elected in 1965 and remained in office until 1967.

Provincial politics
Smith ran as a candidate in the Calgary provincial electoral district in the 1955 Alberta general election. He finished first in the vote counts on the first ballot.  He resigned in 1957 to run for Parliament.

Federal politics
Smith ran in the district of Calgary South in the 1957 federal election. He won by 10,000 votes over Donald McKay.  In the election the following year, he won by 23,000 votes over the nearest candidate.  In the 1962 federal election. His margin of victory was significantly reduced, but he still won in a landslide. Smith retired from federal politics in 1963 at the dissolution of the house. During his time as a Member of Parliament, he served as a delegate to the United Nations.

Late life
Smith became an influential business man after his career in public office.  In 1961 he and Milt Harradence used their political influence with Prime John Diefenbaker to make Lynn Garrison's Lancaster Memorial Fund a success. This saw Lancaster FM-136, purchased from Crown Assets Disposal Corporation by Lynn Garrison, displayed at McCall Field, Calgary as a memorial to those who had trained under the British Commonwealth Air Training Plan. Smith had won his Distinguished Flying Cross while flying Lancasters during World War II. He served as an executive on numerous companies, sat on public boards, and volunteered in youth sports programs. In 1988 he was appointed Chief of Protocol for the 1988 Winter Olympic Games in Calgary. In 1998, Smith founded the Calgary Homeless Foundation, a registered charity committed to end homelessness in Calgary.

In 2006 he endorsed Mark Norris for the leadership of the Alberta Progressive Conservative Party.

Awards
Smith became a member of the Order of Canada in 1988 and an officer in 2003. That same year he was also given an honorary doctor of laws degree from the University of Calgary.  He was awarded the Alberta Order of Excellence and in 1997 he became Honorary Colonel of the 416 Tactical Fighter Squadron.

References

External links
Legislative Assembly of Alberta Members Listing
 

1919 births
2008 deaths
Progressive Conservative Association of Alberta MLAs
Members of the House of Commons of Canada from Alberta
Progressive Conservative Party of Canada MPs
Calgary city councillors
Canadian military personnel of World War II
1988 Winter Olympics
Recipients of the Distinguished Flying Cross (United Kingdom)
Officers of the Order of Canada
Deaths from cancer in Alberta
Members of the Alberta Order of Excellence